Zhlobin is a city in Gomel Region, Belarus, located on the Dnieper River. It serves as the administrative center of Zhlobin District. As of 2017, the population was 76,078.

The city is notable for being the location where steelmaker BMZ was established. BMZ is one of the largest companies in Belarus, and an important producer in the worldwide markets of steel wires and cords. The company is the main sustainer of the town's economy.

History 
In 1939, 19% of the town's population was Jewish. During World War II, Zhlobin was occupied by the German Army from 3 July 1941 until 13 July 1944. The Nazis captured the Jews and imprisoned them in 2 different ghettos, where they suffered from starvation, disease and abuse. On April 12, 1942, 1,200 Jews were murdered in the ghettos.

Sport 

Metallurg Zhlobin of the Belarusian Extraleague is the local pro hockey team.

Industrial enterprises of Zhlobin 

 OJSC "BMZ - managing company of the holding" BMK "

 Branch of JSC "RMCC" "Zhlobin Dairy Plant"

 PUE "Zhlobinselkhozkhimiya"

 OJSC "Zhlobin garment factory"

 State enterprise "Zhlobin mobile mechanized column 71"
 JSC "AFPK "Zhlobin Meat Processing Plant"
 JSC "BelFa"
 Zhlobin bakery
 OJSC "Zhlobinmebel"
 TPU "Metallurgtorg"

Twin towns – sister cities

Zhlobin is twinned with:
 Scalenghe, Italy  (since 1992)
 Smederevo, Serbia
 Vyksa, Russia

Gallery

References

External links
 Горад Жлобін // Radzima.org 
 Zhlobin.org: Information and photos 
 Zhlobin.By: News, photos, useful files 
 The murder of the Jews of Žlobin during World War II, at Yad Vashem website.

Populated places in Gomel Region
Cities in Belarus
Holocaust locations in Belarus
Populated places on the Dnieper in Belarus